Injun Trouble may refer to two Looney Tunes shorts:

Injun Trouble (1938 film), directed by Bob Clampett
Injun Trouble (1969 film), directed by Robert McKimson